Alicia Paz is an artist based in London, working internationally. Born in Mexico City, Paz graduated from UC Berkeley, École nationale supérieure des Beaux-Arts of Paris, Goldsmiths College and Royal College of Art London.

Over several years, Alicia Paz has focused on the tension between artifice/ illusion and the veracity of actual processes involved in painting, exposing the duplicitous nature of representation. Through her work, she explores notions of hybridity, assemblage, and metamorphosis, focusing particularly on the female figure: the self is experienced and presented as multiple, fluid, paradoxical. Paz's paintings are as much portraits as they are landscapes, combining references that range from erudite painting or the history of the painted image, to citations of advertising images or comics. Inhabiting fantastical and exotic landscapes, Paz's feminine subjects become fused and combined with organic life. Strange and unsettling visions of tree-women and monster-women also represent the fusion of the subject with painting itself: she often depicts amphibian or plant-like figures “weeping” pigment, their limbs, hair, and various ornamental accoutrements mud-caked and dripping, as if extracted from a colourful, post-cognitive swamp.

Paz is working on a larger research and production project exploring the network of women that are playing an important rule in her life, personally and professionally. Her project is supported by the Arts Council England. She developed her research it into three exhibition, each specifically adapted to the location and with new work for each show.

Selected works
Island of Dolls (Insel der Puppen), 2017, large exterior sculpture in email, steel and concrete, a commission for the Kunstmuseum Kloster Unser Lieben Frauen in Magdeburg
L'effrontée, 2011, mixed media on paper, 74 × 56 cm
Trapèze, 2010, oil, acrylic, collage on canvas 200 × 160 cm (FRAC Languedoc-Roussillon collection)
When the Machine Stops, 2006, oil, acrylic, collage on canvas, 130 × 97 cm (Colección Costantini, MALBA Museum, Buenos Aires, Argentina)
Ghosts, oil, acrylic on canvas, 200 × 160 cm, 1999 (FRAC Île-de-France collection)
Colossus, 1995, acrylic on canvas, 150 × 120 cm (FMAC Paris collection)

Exhibitions

Solo exhibitions (selection) 
2022: , Paris, Juntas

2021: Visual Arts Centre, Scunthorpe, River Makers

2021: Beecroft Art Gallery, Southend-on-Sea, Río y Mar (River and Sea)

2010: LAC Narbonne, in association with FRAC Languedoc-Rousillon for Casanova Forever, Sigean France

2007: Unit 2 Gallery, London Metropolitan University, London UK

2006: Houldsworth Gallery, London, UK

2005: Ruth Benzacar Gallery, Buenos Aires, Argentina

2000: Galerie Yvonamor Palix, Paris, France

Group exhibitions (selection) 
2021: Beecroft Art Gallery, Southend UK, Río y Mar (River and Sea), as part of Estuary 2021

2012: Through the Looking Glass, The Agency Gallery, London, UK

2011: Round and Round and Round (Part 2), exhibition drawn from the FRAC IDF Collection, curated by Xavier Franceschi, Parc culturel de Rentilly, France

2009: Multiverse, curated by Ole Hagen, Danielle Arnaud Gallery, London, UK

2008: Jerwood Contemporary Painters, Jerwood Space, London, UK

2007: Celeste Art Prize, selected by Goldsmiths College Curating MA, London, UK

2007: Incheon Biennale, Incheon, South Korea

2006: John Moores 24, selectors: Peter Blake, Tracey Emin, Walker Art Gallery, Liverpool Biennial, UK

2004: EAST International, selectors: Neo Rauch, Gerd Harry Lybke, Norwich, UK

2004: Mind the Gap, 10 London Artists, sponsored by British Council, Triangle, Marseille, France

1999: ZAC 99, collaboration directed by "Bureau d'Etudes" and Jota Castro, Musée d'Art Moderne de la Ville de Paris, France

1998:Tamayo Museum Biennale, Oaxaca, Mexico

Awards, grants and residencies
2022: Cité internationale des arts, Paris 

2022: residency at the Leonora Carrington Museum, Mexico

2002: Triangle France, Artist's Residency, La Friche de la Belle de Mai, Marseilles, France

2002: Cité internationale des arts, Artist's Residency in Paris

2001: Gasworks Artist's Residency, London, UK

2001: Grant awarded by Fondo Nacional para la Cultura y las Artes, Mexico

1999: Delfina Studio Trust Residency, London, UK

Collections
 Musée d'Art Moderne de Céret, France
 Hanlim Museum, Daejeon, Korea
 FMAC City of Paris, France
 
 FRAC Languedoc-Roussillon
 Colección Costantini, MALBA, Buenos Aires, Argentina
 APT, Mexico City

References

Further links

 Alicia Paz, Website of the artist
Uwe Gellner, Annegret Laabs, Jeannette Louie. Alicia Paz - The Garden of Follies. Verlag für Moderne Kunst, Vienna, 2016. 

 
 
 
 ''''.
 

20th-century Mexican painters
21st-century Mexican painters
British women painters
Mexican women painters
People from Mexico City
Alumni of Goldsmiths, University of London
University of California, Berkeley alumni
Alumni of the Royal College of Art
École des Beaux-Arts alumni
Living people
1967 births
20th-century British women artists
21st-century British women artists